Thulasi Jalandar is a 1947 Indian, Tamil language film directed by K. B. Nagabhushanam. The film featured P. U. Chinnappa, P. Kannamba, Kothamangalam Seenu and T. S. Jaya in the lead roles.

Cast 
The following list was adapted from the database of Film News Anandan

Male cast
P. U. Chinnappa
Kothamangalam Seenu
T. S. Durairaj
R. Balasubramaniam

Female cast
P. Kannamba
S. Varalakshmi
T. S. Jaya
Rushyendramani

Production 
The film was produced by K. B. Nagabhushanam under the banner Raja Rajeswari Films owned by him and his wife P. Kannamba. He also directed the film. The story and dialogues were written by T. C. Vadivelu Naikkar. Cinematography was done by Thambu (C. V. Ramakrishnan) while the editing was done by N. K. Gopal. Sekar and Saama were in charge of art direction. Somu and Gopal handled the still photography. The film was made at the Gemini Studios.

Soundtrack 
The music was composed by M. D. Parthasarathy while the lyrics were penned by Papanasam Sivan.

References

External links 

Indian black-and-white films